Musgrave Ranges is a mountain range in Central Australia, straddling the boundary of South Australia (Anangu Pitjantjatjara Yankunytjatjara) and the Northern Territory (MacDonnell Shire), extending into Western Australia. It is between the Great Victoria Desert to the south and the Gibson Desert to the north.

Inhabitants 
They were originally inhabited by the indigenous Yankunytjatjara people. The English explorer William Gosse and his team were the first Europeans to visit the region in the 1870s. Gosse named the mountains after Anthony Musgrave, then Governor of South Australia. At the start of the 20th century, Yankunytjatjara people began migrating east, and groups of Pitjantjatjara moved into the Musgrave region from the west. Today, the majority of the families in the communities of Amata and Kaltjiti identify as Pitjantjatjara.

In a historic decision freehold title to the South Australian portion of the Musgrave Ranges was granted to the Pitjantjatjara people by virtue of the Anangu Pitjantjatjara Yankunytjatjara Land Rights Act 1981.

Mineral exploration 
In order to combat unemployment, the Pitjantjatjara Elders seek to develop employment and opportunity within the Pitjantjatjara Lands.  Mineral exploration companies in particular have been keen to discuss possible business alliances with the Pitjantjatjara people because in addition to being a highly prospective region (platinum group elements, gold, uranium, copper, silver, possibly oil), the region represents the largest freehold Aboriginal province in Australia and has had no modern mineral exploration techniques applied since the Land Rights Act of 1981.

See also
 Olia Chain
 Petermann Ranges

References 

Mountain ranges of South Australia
Mountain ranges of Western Australia
Mountain ranges of the Northern Territory
Anangu Pitjantjatjara Yankunytjatjara
Pitjantjatjara